Gugiaite is a melilite mineral, named for the Chinese village of Gugia where it was first discovered. It occurs mostly in skarns with melanite adjacent to an alkali syenite and has no economic value. Its crystals are small tetragonal tablets with vitreous luster and perfect cleavage. It is colorless and transparent with a density of three. The mineral belongs to space group P-421m and is strongly piezoelectric. 

Shortly after the discovery of gugiaite, it was noted that a new name was unnecessary as it could have been considered an end member of meliphanite,  differing mainly in containing much less Na and F (Fleischer 1963).  Recent data have confirmed that gugiaite differs from meliphanite optically and structurally (Grice and Hawthorne 2002). Gugiaite is a melilite and is distinctly different from other beryllium minerals such as meliphanite and leucophanite (Grice and Hawthorne 2002). Gugiaite is named for its locality near the village of Gugia, China (Peng et al. 1962). Incongruent information exists regarding Gugia; consequently the actual location of this village within China is unclear (de Fourestier 2005). Gujia is most often referenced as being in either Jiangsu Province or Liaoning Province (Yang et al. 2001; Mandarino 2005).

Composition 
It is chemically similar to jeffreyite , meliphanite , and leucophanite  in that they all contain essential calcium, beryllium, and silicon (Hawthorne and Huminicki 2002). Two chemical analyses gave similar results and one is as follows:  44.90,  2.17,  0.11, MnO 0.07, MgO 0.38, CaO 40.09, BeO 9.49,  0.72,  0.20,  0.36,  0.90, F 0.25, Cl 0.18,  0.08,  trace, -O=(F,Cl)2 0.15, sum 99.94, 99.79% (Fleischer 1963). Common impurities are Ti, Zr, Hf, Al, Fe, Mn, Mg, Na, K, F, Cl, and P (Fleischer 1963).

Geologic occurrence 
Gugiaite is usually found in skarn in contact with alkaline syenite with melanite, orthoclase, aegirine, titanite, apatite, vesuvianite, and prehnite (Peng et al. 1962).  It occurs as thin square tablets, to 3 mm, in small cavities in skarn and enclosed in melanite (Peng et al. 1962). Skarns are often formed at the contact zone between granite intrusions and carbonate sedimentary rocks through metasomatism. Gugiaite has also been found in a miarolitic cavity in granite (Grew 2002). This type of cavity is crystal lined, irregular, and known for being a source of rare minerals, such as beryllium, that are not normally found in abundance in igneous rocks (https://web.archive.org/web/20091028021704/http://geocities.com/oklahomamgs/London/Pegmatite2.html).  While initially found in Gugia, China, its localities have expanded to include Piedmont, Italy, Ehime Prefecture, Japan, Eastern Siberian Region, Russia, and most recently Telemark, Norway (http://www.mindat.org/min-1769.html).

Crystal structure 
Gugiaite is composed of infinite sheets of tetrahedra with Be-Si-Si linkages and interstitial Ca (Hawthorne and Huminicki 2002). As shown in Figure 1, the oxygen atom bonds to a [4]-coordinated high-valence cation, Si, to produce a discontinuous polymerization of tetrahedra linked by interstitial Ca (Hawthorne and Huminicki 2002). It is isostructural with akermanite with Be occupying the Mg site of akermanite (Hawthorne and Huminicki 2002). X-ray studies by the Weissenberg method show gugiaite to be tetragonal, space group P-421m, space group number 113, and H-M Symbol -42m (Peng et al. 1962). Cell dimensions are: a=b=7.48(2) Ȧ, c=5.044(3) Ȧ, V=277.35 Ȧ, α=β=γ=90◦, and Z=2 (Peng et al. 1962). The axial ratio is a:c=1:0.67617 (Peng et al. 1962). Structurally A is Ca2, T1 is Be(54), T2 is Si2(53), and X is O7 (Yang et al. 2001). The three strongest lines of the X-ray powder data for gugiaite are 2.765(10), 1.485(7), and 1.709(7) (Peng et al. 1962).

Physical properties 
The crystal form of gugiaite occurs as thin tetragonal tablets mostly 2-3 mm across and 0.3-0.5 mm thick, shown in Figure 2 below (Fleischer 1963).  The cleavages are {010} perfect, {001} distinct, and {110} poor (Peng et al. 1962). It is transparent, optically uniaxial (+), and strongly piezoelectric (Peng et al. 1962). See Table for additional physical properties.

Significance 
Gugiaite does not appear to have any political significance or economic value. From a historical perspective, gugiaite was the first beryllium mineral found in skarn systems at contacts between alkaline rocks and limestones (Peng et al. 1962). Also, thermodynamic equilibrium studies involving gugiaite have been conducted to determine the distribution of beryllium between gaseous and solid phases as a function of temperature in attempts to deduce the processes that formed the solar system (Lodders and Lauretta 1997).

References

Notes

Bibliography

 De Fourestier, J. (2005) China, Chinese, and Mineralogy. Rocks & Minerals, 80(2), 119.
 Fleischer, M. (1963) New Mineral Names: Gugiaite. American Mineralogist, 48, 211-212.
 Grew, E. (2002) Mineralogy, Petrology and Geochemistry of Beryllium: An Introduction and List of Beryllium Minerals. Reviews In Mineralogy and Geochemistry, 50-1, 60.
 Pirajno, F. (2012) The Geology and Tectonic Settings of China's Mineral Deposits. Springer Netherlands
 Grice, J., and Hawthorne, F. (2002) New data on Meliphanite, Ca4(Na,Ca)4Be4AlSi7O24(F,O)4 . The Canadian Mineralogist, 40, 971-980.
 Hawthorne, F., and Huminicki, D. (2002) The Crystal Chemistry of Beryllium. Reviews In Mineralogy and Geochemistry, 50-1, 333-403.
 Kimata, M., and Ohashi, H. (1982) The crystal structure of synthetic gugiaite, Ca2BeSi2O7. Neues Jahrbuch Fur Mineralogie- Abhandlungen, 143, 210-222.
 Lodders, K., and Lauretta, D. (1997) The cosmochemical behavior of beryllium and boron. Earth and Planetary Science Letters, 146, 315-327.
 Mandarino, J., and de Fourestier, J. (2005) Mineral Species First Found in the People's Republic Of China. Rocks & Minerals, 80, 114-124.
 Peng, C., Zou, Z., and Tsao, R. (1962) Gugiaite, Ca2BeSi2O7, A New Beryllium Mineral and its Relation to Melilite Group. Scientia Sinica, 11, 977-988.
 Steinshouer, D., Qiang, J., McCabe, P., and Ryder, R. (1999) Maps Showing Geology, Oil and Gas Fields, and Geologic Provinces of the Asia Pacific Region. U.S. Department of the Interior-U.S. Geological Survey, Open- File Report 97-470F.
 Yang, Z.M., Fleck, M., Pertlik, F., Tillmanns, E., and Tao, K.J. (2001) The crystal structure of natural gugiaite, Ca2BeSi2O7. Neues Jahrbuch Fur Mineralogie-Monatshefte, 4, 186-192.
 China Foreigners Guide - Gujia Village, A division of rural area of Qingfengshan Town available at :  http://www.cfguide.com/vil/gujia_152095.htm 
 China Foreigners Guide - Gujia Village, A division of rural area of Tangqiao Town available at :  http://www.cfguide.com/vil/gujia_176231.htm 
 Internet Archive – WayBackMachine – Available at: https://web.archive.org/web/20091028021704/http://geocities.com/oklahomamgs/London/Pegmatite2.html

Calcium minerals
Beryllium
Sorosilicates
Tetragonal minerals
Minerals in space group 113